Yaru is a town in Balochistan province, Pakistan. 

Populated places in Balochistan, Pakistan